Kevin Hawkes may refer to:

Kevin Hawkes (illustrator) on Weslandia and Marven of the Great North Woods
Kevin Hawkes, character in Last Resort (U.S. TV series)